Macrogastra badia is a species of air-breathing land snail, a terrestrial pulmonate gastropod mollusk in the family Clausiliidae.

Distribution 
This species occurs in the Czech Republic - in Bohemia only.

References

Clausiliidae
Gastropods described in 1828